Damir Mužek (born 8 April 1967) is a Croatian retired football midfielder.

Career
He played six years in Austria, and was a substitute for Martin Amerhauser in the 1994 UEFA Cup Final first leg for Casino Salzburg. He also played for Varteks, Slaven Belupo and Inter Zaprešić.

In June 2020 he was announced sports director at NK Vrapče.

Personal life
His son Mateo played professionally in Kazakhstan, among others.

References

1967 births
Living people
Footballers from Zagreb
Association football midfielders
Croatian footballers
NK Zagreb players
SK Sturm Graz players
FC Red Bull Salzburg players
Grazer AK players
NK Varaždin players
NK Slaven Belupo players
NK Čakovec players
NK Inter Zaprešić players
Austrian Football Bundesliga players
Croatian Football League players
Croatian expatriate footballers
Expatriate footballers in Austria
Croatian expatriate sportspeople in Austria
Croatian football managers
NK Hrvatski Dragovoljac managers
NK Vinogradar managers
NK Inter Zaprešić managers